Paititia is a butterfly genus in the tribe Ithomiini in the brush-footed butterfly family, Nymphalidae. The genus is monotypic, containing only Paititia neglecta.

References 

Ithomiini
Nymphalidae of South America
Nymphalidae genera